Louise Byg Kongsholm (born in 1976) is a trend researcher, author and keynote speaker focusing on spirit of time, trends, consumer behaviour and trends specifically within fashion, interior, food and retail/etail.

Kongsholm is the owner and CEO of the Scandinavian trend institute Pej Gruppen. She is also editor in chief and publisher of the four Danish magazines TØJ – Fashion & Business Trends, 365DESIGN and TID & tendenser.

Kongsholm holds a master's degree in strategy and management from Aarhus University, School of Business and Social Sciences and has worked in retail in the UK and in Germany. She was a strategy consultant and management assistant at Lego for five years before she joined Pej Gruppen in 2007. She acquired the company in 2011 and became the CEO in January 2014.

Books
Retail Mega Mag (2022) - www.pejgruppen.com/retailmegamag
Fra vugge til krukke - livsfaser og forbrug (2020) - www.livsfaser.com
Trend sociology v. 2.0 (2019) - www.trendsociology.com
Total Retail (2018) - www.totalretail.com
Cross Channel 2 (Cross Channel 2) (2016) 
Trendsociologi v. 2.0 (Trend sociology volume 2.0) (2015)
Cross Channel: Fremtidens Detailhandel (Cross Channel: The Future of Retail) (2014)
12 bud på 2012 (12 Views on 2012) (2012) 
Livsfaser og forbrug (Life Stages and Consumer Behavior) (2007) 
Trendsociologi (Trend Sociology) (2002)

Magazines
TID & tendensser (bimonthly journal on zeitgeist and megatrends, www.tidogtendenser.dk)
365DESIGN (quarterly trade magazine on design and interior, www.365design.dk)
TØJ - Fashion & Business Trends (quarterly trade magazine on fashion and accessories, www.branchebladettoj.dk)

References

External links
 Overview of ownership and board positions: https://www.proff.dk/rolle/louise-byg-kongsholm/-/4004110532/
 Overview of book publications at online book shop: https://www.saxo.com/dk/forfatter/louise-byg-kongsholm_4354270?page=1
 Speaker profile at booking company: https://www.youandx.com/speakers/louise-byg-kongsholm
 Recorded trend talk (Danish): https://www.youtube.com/watch?v=vCwYBHa20Yk
 Podcast with interview: https://kunderejsen.com/podcast/16-samtale-med-louise-byg-kongsholm-om-livsfaser-megatrends-og-korona
 Quotes in business articles (included in article as trend expert): https://finans.dk/?tags=tag:personer.jp.dk,2014:Louise_Byg_Kongsholm
 Article on new owner of pej gruppen: https://www.herningfolkeblad.dk/artikel/e2b309d2-1643-4c99-bc11-54b2c0d4f6ac/
 Article on life stages as segmentation model: http://blogmindshare.dk/2009/05/19/livsfaser-som-input-til-indsigt-og-innovative-mediestrategier/
 Articles in TID & tendenser: http://tidogtendenser.dk/author/louisebygkongsholm/

1976 births
21st-century Danish women writers
Danish editors
Danish women editors
Living people